Michaël Milon, (born 3 March 1972 in Loches, died 13 March 2002 in Paris) was a French karate champion. His tournament honours included: 
    World Championships – Individual (1994, 1996, 2000)
    World Cup – Individual (1993, 1995, 1997)
    European Championship – Individual (1994, 1995, 1996, 1997)
    European Championship – Team (1991, 1994, 1995, 1996, 1997)
    French Championship – Individual (1993, 1995, 1997, 1998)
    Coupe de France de Karate – Individual (1990, 1993, 1994, 1995, 1997)
    The Mediterranean Games (1990)
In 2000 Milon retired from competitive tournament Karate. In 2001 he became the French national coach for the Junior Karate team. Away from Karate, Milon was a regular on French television.

On 13 March 2002 Michaël Milon was found dead from an apparent cocaine overdose.

References 

1972 births
2002 deaths
French male karateka
Sportspeople from Tours, France
Cocaine-related deaths
Drug-related deaths in France
20th-century French people
21st-century French people